Gianni Iapichino (born March 2, 1969 in Columbus) is an Italian athletics coach and former pole vaulter, long jumper and heptathlete.

Biography
He was husband from 1994 to 2011 of the world champion long jumper Fiona May, with whom he had two daughters, Larissa and Anastasia.
He is now living in Florence and managing his daughter Larissa at professional level via the company founded by him and Larissa, JUMP and later, on 16 June 2021, it was announced that he would train his daughter, thus taking over from Gianni Cecconi.

National titles
Gianni Iapichino has won 7 times the individual national championship.
3 wins in Pole vault (1990, 1991, 1992)
3 wins in Pole vault indoor (1991, 1994, 1995)
1 win in heptathlon indoor (1988)

See also
 Italian all-time top lists – Pole vault

References

External links
 

1969 births
Living people
Sportspeople from Florence
Italian athletics coaches
Italian male pole vaulters
Italian decathletes
Italian Athletics Championships winners
Athletics competitors of Fiamme Oro
World Athletics Championships athletes for Italy